Pilla Nachindi is a 1999 Telugu-language comedy film directed by E.V.V Satyanarayana. The film stars Srikanth, Rachana and Sanghavi. Music for this film was composed by Koti.

Plot
Dattu (Srikanth) is the son-in-law of a rich man Kutumba Rao (Kota Srinivasa Rao). His wife Preethi (Sanghavi) dies in a car accident. As per the wish of his dying daughter, Rao looks after Dattu and is even on the hunt out for a new bride for him. In the process he interviews some girls to keep them as his personal assistant, which in fact is a cover-up for selecting the fiancée for Dattu.

Lingam (MS Narayana) suspects every move of his boss Rao, and tries to spoil his efforts at all stages and only when he informs Rao's wife (Rajitha) about this, the truth comes out into the open. These scenes, like a few others in the movie are meant for comic relief.

Lahari (Rachana Banerjee) runs a comedy club in which AVS, Bharani and others entertain the audience with skits and comedy plays. Rao is impressed by Lahari and decides on her as the fiancée of Dattu. But herein comes a hitch. Since he is a widower, Dattu insists that he would marry only a woman who has lost her hubby. Rachana agrees to pretend to be a widow and even shows a picture of one Gopalakrishna (Brahmanandam) published in the obituary column of a daily, as her deceased husband.

Gopalakrishna's wife loves Babu Mohan and it is she who gives the advertisement in the newspaper! And when the marriage between Srikanth and Rachana is fixed, the dead Gopalakrishna arrives on the scene along with his friend Ali to pep up the climax proceedings.

Cast
Srikanth as Dattu
Rachana as Lahari
Sanghavi as Preethi
Kota Srinivasa Rao as Kutumba Rao
Brahmanandam as Gotham Gopalakrishna
Babu Mohan as Sharukh Mehdi
Ali as Salman Mehendi
M. S. Narayana as Lingam
AVS
Raja Ravindra
Bandla Ganesh
Rajitha as Susmita
Mani Chandana as Kajol
Madhumani as Nurse

Music
Music was composed by Koti.

Reception
Sify called the film "hilarious to the core", praising the performances of Kota Srinivasa Rao, MS Narayana, and Brahmanandam as well as the music, dialogue, and camera work, and hailed its release among a "spate of mundane love stories". However, Srikanth's character was described as leaving him with "nothing much to do" and the plot's theme was criticised. Griddaluru Gopalrao of Zamin Ryot also commended the film, particularly applauding the direction and comedy.

References

1990s Telugu-language films
1999 films